Jefferson Township is one of sixteen townships in Buchanan County, Iowa, USA.  As of the 2000 census, its population was 726.

Geography 

The unincorporated community of Shady Grove is at the northwestern edge of the township. According to the USGS, it contains four cemeteries: Bear Creek School, First, Jefferson Township and Shady Grove (historical).

References

External links 

 US-Counties.com
 City-Data.com

Townships in Buchanan County, Iowa
Townships in Iowa